The 1948 Arizona State–Flagstaff Lumberjacks football team was an American football team that represented Arizona State Teachers College at Flagstaff (now known as Northern Arizona University) in the Border Conference during the 1948 college football season. In their second and final year under head coach Nick Ragus, the team compiled a 4–5 record (1–2 against conference opponents), was outscored by a total of 187 to 144, and finished in seventh place out of nine teams in the Border Conference.  The team played its home games at Skidmore Field in Flagstaff, Arizona.

Schedule

References

Arizona State-Flagstaff
Northern Arizona Lumberjacks football seasons
Arizona State-Flagstaff Lumberjacks football